The women's 4 × 400 metres relay at the 2018 IAAF World Indoor Championships took place on 3 and 4 March 2018.

Summary
USA, in lane 5 was led off by Quanera Hayes, opening up a slight lead from the gun, but going in to the second turn, Ukraine's Tetyana Melnyk accelerated and hit the break line ahead.  Hayes was unable to get ahead of Melnyk, held to the outside of their penultimate turn.  Down the backstretch, Hayes was able to ease into the lead, with Jamaica's Tovea Jenkins on her heels.  Through the final turn Hayes and Jenkins put a gap on the next pursuer as Melnyk tied up and Poland's Justyna Święty-Ersetic had to make her way around the obstacle.  Hayes's split 51.56.  With Jamaica now in second place, Janieve Russell squeezed inside of Ukraine's #2 runner Kateryna Klymiuk to take the handoff just behind USA's Georganne Moline, who, with help from the momentary chaos, opened up an additional 2 metres on Russell.  Poland's Patrycja Wyciszkiewicz latched on to Russell as Moline expanded the gap to 5 metres after the first lap.  There was more than 15 metres further gap back to the British team represented by Hannah Williams.  On her second lap, Moline struggled, at one point losing her balance on the steeply banked turn.  Russell pulled in the gap, the two teams passing virtually at the same time, with Wyciszkiewicz just a metre back, the split 50.87.  USA's Shakima Wimbley got to the turn first and held a 1 metre lead over Jamaica's Anastasia Le-Roy.  Two metres back Aleksandra Gaworska kept Poland in the mix.  Through her first lap, Wimbley opened up an additional metre on Le-Roy as the two separated from Gaworska.  Wimbley's split 51.27.  On the anchor, USA had the world champion Courtney Okolo, while Jamaica had their star Stephenie Ann McPherson untested from these championships, a victim of the lane violation disqualification epidemic.  McPherson stayed locked to Okolo, more than a metre behind, with Poland's Małgorzata Hołub-Kowalik another 7 metres back.  Down the first backstretch, Okolo stretched the lead, but in the second turn McPherson reeled her back in.  The second time down the backstretch Okolo extended the lead again and coming off the final turn McPherson took another run at her, closing the gap slightly but unable to make enough progress.  USA crossed the line first, Jamaica second, Poland third and distantly, GBR, Ukraine and Italy.

After the race, there was a flurry of disqualifications and appeals. After the dust settled, Jamaica was disqualified for Russell's maneuver at the handoff, advancing Poland to silver and the home team to bronze. Initially, Great Britain were disqualified for obstruction after a protest from the Ukrainian team. As a result, the originally fifth-placed Ukraine team was briefly boosted to bronze, but then an appeal by the British team against the disqualification was successful and the result reinstated.

Results

Heats
The heats were started on 3 March at 13:20.

Final
The final was started on 4 March at 16:30.

References

4 x 400 metres relay
4 × 400 metres relay at the World Athletics Indoor Championships
2018 in women's athletics